The 1958 All-Ireland Minor Football Championship was the 27th staging of the All-Ireland Minor Football Championship, the Gaelic Athletic Association's premier inter-county Gaelic football tournament for boys under the age of 18.

Meath entered the championship as defending champions, however, they were defeated in the Leinster Championship.

On 28 September 1958, Dublin won the championship following a 2-02 to 0-8 defeat of Mayo in the All-Ireland final. This was their sixth All-Ireland title overall and their first in two championship seasons.

Results

Connacht Minor Football Championship

Quarter-Final

Mayo 5-7 Sligo 1-4 Ballina.

Semi-Finals

Roscommon 1-6 Leitrim 0-8 Roscommon.

Mayo 4-13 Galway 1-4 Tuam.

Final

July 13th Mayo 1-8 Roscommon 1-4 Roscommon.

Munster Minor Football Championship

Ulster Minor Football Championship

Leinster Minor Football Championship

All-Ireland Minor Football Championship

Semi-Finals

Mayo 4-5 Kerry 3-5

Final

Championship statistics

Miscellaneous

 Down win the Ulster Championship for the first time in their history.

References

1958
All-Ireland Minor Football Championship